Milan Kocić (born 16 February 1990) is a Slovenian footballer who plays as a defender for Clivense.

References

External links

NZS profile 

1990 births
Living people
Slovenian footballers
Association football fullbacks
Association football midfielders
U.S. Triestina Calcio 1918 players
TSV Hartberg players
NK Rudar Velenje players
NK Aluminij players
Bohemians 1905 players
Panionios F.C. players
FC Voluntari players
AFC Chindia Târgoviște players
NK Tabor Sežana players
Second Professional Football League (Bulgaria) players
2. Liga (Austria) players
Slovenian PrvaLiga players
Czech First League players
Super League Greece players
Liga I players
Slovenian expatriate footballers
Expatriate footballers in Italy
Slovenian expatriate sportspeople in Italy
Expatriate footballers in Bulgaria
Slovenian expatriate sportspeople in Bulgaria
Expatriate footballers in Austria
Slovenian expatriate sportspeople in Austria
Expatriate footballers in the Czech Republic
Slovenian expatriate sportspeople in the Czech Republic
Expatriate footballers in Greece
Slovenian expatriate sportspeople in Greece
Expatriate footballers in Romania
Slovenian expatriate sportspeople in Romania